Black Rose or Black Roses may refer to:

Books
 Black Rose (.hack), a fictional character from the .hack media franchise
 Black Rose (magazine), an anarchist magazine published in Boston during the 1970s and 1980s
 Black Roses (novel), 1929 novel by Francis Brett Young
 The Black Rose (novel), a 1945 historical novel by Thomas B. Costain
 Black Rose Books, a Montréal publishing house primarily known for its anarchist titles
 Kodachi Kuno ("The Black Rose"), a character in Rumiko Takahashi's Ranma  media franchise
 Black Rose, an incarnation of Roxanne Simpson in Ghost Rider comic books

Film and TV
 Black Roses (1921 film), a 1921 American crime drama film
 Black Roses (1932 film), a Swedish drama film
 Black Roses (1935 film), a 1935 German historical drama film
 Black Roses (1945 film), a 1945 Swedish drama film
 The Black Rose, a 1950 adaptation of the book, starring Orson Welles
 Black Roses (1988 film), a 1988 horror film
 Black Rose (2014 film), a 2014 action film
 Black Rose (2018 film), a 2018 Nigerian drama film

Television
 Black Rose (Singaporean TV series), a Singaporean television variety show that aired on MediaCorp Channel 8 in 2010 and again in 2014
 Black Rose (Turkish TV series), a 2013–2016 Turkish drama television series that aired on Fox Turkey

Music

Classical
"Black Roses", song by Delius
"Black Roses", song by Sibelius

Musical ensembles
 Black Rose, a Danish rock band featuring King Diamond
 Black Rose (British band), an English heavy metal band
 Black Rose (Fiji group), otherwise known as Rosiloa

Albums
 Black Rose (Cher album), 1980
 Black Rose (J. D. Souther album), 1976
 Black Rose (Tyrese album), 2015
 Black Rose: A Rock Legend, a 1979 album by Thin Lizzy
 The Black Rose EP, a 2007 EP by Blindside
 Black Roses (The Rasmus album), 2008
 Black Roses, an unreleased album by Foxy Brown (rapper)

Songs
 "Black Rose", by Borealis from the album World of Silence
 "Black Rose", by Buffalocomotive from the album Tears of the Enchanted Mainframe
 "Black Rose", by John Cale from the album Artificial Intelligence
 "Black Rose", by Trapt from the album Only Through the Pain
 "Black Rose", by Volbeat from the album Seal the Deal & Let's Boogie
 "A Black Rose", by Therion, from the album Symphony Masses: Ho Drakon Ho Megas
 "Grim Heart/Black Rose", by Converge from the album No Heroes
 "Black Roses", by Clare Bowen from the soundtrack The Music of Nashville: Season 2, Volume 2
 "Black Roses", by Charli XCX from the album True Romance
 "Black Roses", by Clear Light from the album Clear Light
 "Black Roses", by Inner Circle
 "Black Rose", by Billy Joe Shaver, sung by Waylon Jennings, from the album Honky Tonk Heroes
 "Black Roses", by Trey Songz from the album Ready

Other
 Black rose (symbolism), a rose with black petals
 Black Rose (BDSM organization), a BDSM organization headquartered in Washington, DC
 Black rose (grape), a grape cultivar
 Black Rose (pinball), a pinball machine produced by Midway
 Black Rose (wrestler) (born 1981), Puerto Rican wrestler
 Black Roses (American Samoan football club)

See also
 Blue Rose (disambiguation)
 Red rose (disambiguation)
 White Rose (disambiguation)
 Yellow rose (disambiguation)